The PlayStation 3 (PS3) video game console has been produced in various models during its life cycle. At launch, the PlayStation 3 was available with either a 20 or 60 GB hard disk drive in the US and Japan, respectively— priced from US$499 to US$599; and with either a 40, 60, or 80 GB hard disk drive in Europe, priced from £299 to £425. Since then, Sony have released two further redesigned models, the "Slim" and "Super Slim" models. , the total number of consoles sold is estimated at 87.4 million.

Original model

There are several original PlayStation 3 hardware models, which are commonly referred to by the size of their included hard disk drive: 20, 40, 60, 80, or 160 GB. Although referred to by their HDD size, the capabilities of the consoles vary by region and release date. The only difference in the appearance of the first five models was the color of the trim, number of USB ports, the presence or absence of a door (which covers the flash card readers on equipped models) and some minor changes to the air vents. All retail packages include one or two Sixaxis controllers or a DualShock 3 controller (beginning June 12, 2008), one Type-A to Mini-B USB cable (for connecting the controller and PlayStation Portable to the system), one composite video/stereo audio output cable, one Ethernet cable (20, 60 and CECHExx 80 GB only) and one power cable. The original and CECHExx models were also the only video game consoles ever made to feature a Super Audio CD player.

All models support software emulation of the original PlayStation, but support for PlayStation 2 backward compatibility diminished with later compatible models and the last model to have integrated backward compatibility was the NTSC 80 GB (CECHE) Metal Gear Solid 4 Bundle. Compatibility issues with games for both systems are detailed in a public database hosted by the manufacturer. All models, excluding the 20 GB model, include 802.11 b/g Wi-Fi.

In addition to all of the features of the 20 GB model, the 60 GB model has internal IEEE 802.11 b/g Wi-Fi, multiple flash card readers (SD/MultiMedia Card, CompactFlash Type I/Type II, Microdrive, Memory Stick/PRO/Duo) and a chrome colored trim. In terms of hardware, the 80 GB model CECHE released in South Korea is identical to the 60 GB model CECHC released in the PAL regions, except for the difference in hard drive size.
The European 60GB model (CECHC), the South Korean and North American CECHE 80GB model excludes the PlayStation 2 "Emotion Engine" CPU chip with it being replaced by an emulated version via the Cell Broadband Engine. However, it retains the "Graphics Synthesizer" GPU resulting in a hybrid hardware and software emulation. Due to the elimination of the "Emotion Engine" and its replacement with a software-emulated version, the level of PlayStation 2 compatibility was slightly reduced. The 40 GB, 80 GB (CECHL, CECHM, and CECHK) and 160 GB models have two USB ports instead of the four USB ports on other models and do not include multiple flash card readers, SACD support, or backward compatibility with PlayStation 2 games. This was due to the removal of "Graphics Synthesizer" GPU, which stripped the units of all PlayStation 2 based hardware.

No official Wi-Fi or flash memory card readers were ever released by Sony for the 20 GB system, although Sony had plans to do so. As of September 2009, Sony had placed no further emphasis on these proposed add-ons. Nevertheless, as the model features four USB 2.0 ports, wireless networking and flash memory card support can already be obtained through the use of widely available external USB adapters and third-party PS3-specific media hubs.

It was rumored that the Cell processors in the third-generation PS3s (40 GB, 2008 80 GB (CECHL, CECHM, CECHK) and 160 GB) would move from a 90 nm process to the newer 65 nm process, which SCEI CEO Kaz Hirai later confirmed, and later to 45 nm. This change lowers the power consumption of the console and makes it less expensive to produce.

Slim model

The redesigned version of the PlayStation 3 (commonly referred to as the "PS3 Slim" and officially branded "PS3") features an upgradeable 120 GB, 160 GB, 250 GB or 320 GB hard drive and is 33% smaller, 36% lighter and consumes 34% (CECH-20xx) or 45% (CECH-21xx) less power than the previous model, or one third of the original PS3 model. The Cell microprocessor has moved to a 45 nm manufacturing process, which lets it run cooler and quieter than previous models, and the cooling system has been redesigned. The RSX moved to a 40 nm process in the latest revision. The PS3 slim also includes support for CEC (more commonly referred to by its manufacturer brandings of BraviaSync, VIERA Link, EasyLink etc.) which allows control of the console over HDMI by using the TV's remote control. The PS3 Slim no longer has the "main power" switch like the previous PS3 models, similar to redesigned slimline PlayStation 2. Support for emulation to play PS2 titles is not present in the Slim version, however, shortly after the release of the PS3 Slim, Sony announced a new series of PS2 remasters called Classics HD as in PS2 and PSP titles remastered in HD for the PS3 with Trophies and sometimes PlayStation Move compatibility added. As of October 2011, PS2 classics are available for purchase in the PlayStation Store.

The PS3 Slim was officially released on September 1, 2009, in North America and Europe and on September 3, 2009, in Japan, Australia and New Zealand. However, some retailers such as Amazon.com, Best Buy and GameStop started to sell the PS3 slim on August 25, 2009. The PS3 Slim sold in excess of a million units in its first 3 weeks on sale. A 250 GB Final Fantasy XIII-themed PS3 Slim, which was white in color with pink designs, was officially announced on September 24, 2009 at the Tokyo Game Show as part of a bundle in Japan for Final Fantasy XIII, it was initially revealed in U.S. Federal Communications Commission (FCC) filings as the PS3 CECH-2000B. Sony Computer Entertainment Australia also announced later that day that it would be bringing the 250 GB PS3 slim to Australia which would be bundled with other games and will not feature the Final Fantasy XIII theme. Although no North American bundles have been announced for the 250 GB PS3 slim, it is sold as a stand-alone console in North America.

In July 2010, Sony announced two new sizes of the Slim PS3, 160 GB and 320 GB, with the 120 GB model being discontinued in Japan. These were launched on July 29, 2010, in Japan, with the 160 GB version available in "Classic White" as well as the standard "Charcoal Black". The black 160 GB version was also made available as a bundle with the Japan-only DVR accessory torne. It was later announced that the new sizes were to be launched in other regions, with the 160 GB model available from August 2010 in North America and October 2010 in Europe. The 320 GB model is to be available in North America only as part of a bundle with PlayStation Move, a PlayStation Eye and a copy of Sports Champions, and in Europe with PlayStation Move, a PlayStation Eye and a demo disc. The bundles were released on September 19, 2010, and September 15, 2010, respectively, to coincide with the launch of PlayStation Move.

Super Slim model

In September 2012, Sony announced that a new slimmer PS3 redesign (CECH-4000) was due to be released in late 2012 and that it would be available with either a 250 GB or 500 GB hard drive.

In PAL regions, the 250 GB model is not available; a model with 12 GB of flash memory (CECH-4000A) is available in its place. A standalone 250 GB hard drive (CECH-ZHD1) is available to upgrade this model. In the UK, the 500 GB model was released on September 28, 2012, while the 12 GB model was made available on October 12, 2012.

Both are roughly 25% smaller and about 20% lighter than the original PS3 Slim. This version has a sliding disc cover rather than the slot-loading drive found on the previous PlayStation 3 consoles.

A CECH-4200 model with nearly identical hardware to that of the CECH-4000 model was introduced in 2013 to follow the AACS rule of inhibiting analog (component and composite) output of Blu-ray disc content effective since 2014. While in previous 3000 and 4000 models the output limit was already set at 480i to meet a January 1, 2011 deadline in agreement also with the aforementioned AACS.

A vertical stand (CECH-ZST1J) is also available for these models and was launched on the same day as the consoles in their respective regions.

Model comparison
Key:    

All Piano Black and Ceramic White models have a glossy finish
All models include: Blu-ray/DVD/CD drive, HDMI 1.3a (upgraded to HDMI 1.4 via firmware update), Bluetooth 2.0, Gigabit Ethernet (10BASE-T, 100BASE-TX, 1000BASE-T) and PlayStation backward compatibility through software emulation.
Model numbers differ by region. See PlayStation 3 hardware – model numbers for details.

a Linux support removed in firmware version 3.21. See OtherOS support for details
b Ceramic white model available in Asia and Japan only.
c Satin silver model available in Asia and Japan only.
d Gun-Metal Gray model is only available as part of the MGS4 bundle.
e Yakuza 3 bundle features a Ceramic White model with custom grey dragon designs on its case. This version had a limited run of 10,000 units.
f "Cloud Black" (dark grey) console is only available as part of a Japanese limited edition Final Fantasy VII: Advent Children bundle and features a custom white design on the console
g White and Pink model is only available as part of the Japanese Final Fantasy XIII bundle and features a pink design of Final Fantasy XIII character "Lightning" on its case.
h Titanium Blue model is only available as part of the Japanese Gran Turismo 5 Titanium Blue bundle
i Magical Gold model is only available as part of the Japanese Ni no Kuni bundle
j Black and Pink model is only available as part of the Japanese Final Fantasy XIII-2 bundle and features a pink design of Final Fantasy XIII character "Lightning" on its case.
k Gold model is only available as part of the Japanese One Piece: Pirate Warriors Gold bundle
l Black and Gold model is only available as part of the Japanese Yakuza 5 bundle and features a gold emblem design on its case. 
m Black and White model is only available as part of the Japanese Fist of the North Star: Ken's Rage 2 bundle and features a white emblem design on its case
n Black and Blue model is only available as part of the Japanese Metal Gear Rising: Revengeance bundle

See also
 PlayStation models
 PlayStation 2 models

References

models
Seventh-generation video game consoles
Sony consoles
Cell BE architecture